Dong Jiong (born 20 August 1973) is a Chinese badminton player who ranked among the world's men's singles elite in the mid and late 1990s.

Career 
In a relatively short career at the top level, Dong won some of badminton's biggest events, including the prestigious All England and Denmark Open titles in 1997. He was a silver medalist at the 1996 Olympic Games in Atlanta, losing the final in two close games to Denmark's Poul-Erik Hoyer Larsen. Among Dong's badminton achievements were victories at the Thailand Open (1995, 1996), China Open (1995, 1997, 1999), Swiss Open (1997), World Cup (1996), and quadrennial Asian Games (1998). The successes of Dong and his contemporary and rival Sun Jun marked the start of a revival in men's badminton fortunes for China, which, after dominating in the 1980s, had lost the initiative to Indonesia.

Dong retired in 2001 without any job offer or pension from his employer, the Beijing municipal sports bureau. Rekindling his passion for cultivating the badminton sport, Dong built up a franchise that includes five amateur badminton clubs, and was hired as the head coach of China's Paralympic badminton team. Dong felt lucky he could carry his own legacy in the amateur sport arena. He picked up new knowledge and confidence outside the top sport environment.

Coaching players with disabilities since 2009, Dong focused his efforts on them at his clubs. He's spent money each year on improving the facilities while applying for an entry to the 2016 Paralympic Games.

Achievements

Olympic Games 
Men's singles

World Cup 
Men's singles

Asian Games 
Men's singles

Asian Championships 
Men's singles

Asian Cup 
Men's singles

East Asian Games 
Men's singles

IBF World Grand Prix 
The World Badminton Grand Prix sanctioned by International Badminton Federation (IBF) from 1983 to 2006.

Men's singles

IBF International 
Men's singles

Men's doubles

References

External links 
 
 
 
 
 

1973 births
Living people
Badminton players from Beijing
Chinese male badminton players
Badminton players at the 1996 Summer Olympics
Olympic badminton players of China
Olympic silver medalists for China
Olympic medalists in badminton
Medalists at the 1996 Summer Olympics
Badminton players at the 1994 Asian Games
Badminton players at the 1998 Asian Games
Asian Games gold medalists for China
Asian Games silver medalists for China
Asian Games bronze medalists for China
Asian Games medalists in badminton
Medalists at the 1994 Asian Games
Medalists at the 1998 Asian Games
World No. 1 badminton players
20th-century Chinese people